Ronald C. Raymond (born May 10, 1951) is an American politician from Pennsylvania who served as a Republican member of the Pennsylvania House of Representatives for the 162nd district from 1985 through 2008.

Early life and education
Raymond was born in Chester, Pennsylvania.  He graduated from Sharon Hill High School in 1969 and attended Widener University.

Career
Raymond worked as a real estate agent and was elected to the Folcroft Borough council in 1976.  He was elected to the Sharon Hill council and served from 1978 to 1981.  He was elected to the Pennsylvania House of Representatives for the 162nd district and served from 1985 to 2008.  He was not a candidate for reelection in 2008.

Personal life
He and his wife live in Ridley Park, Pennsylvania and have 2 children.

References

External links
Pennsylvania House of Representatives - Ronald C. Raymond official PA House website
Pennsylvania House Republican Caucus - Representative Ronald C. Raymond official Party website
Biography, voting record, and interest group ratings at Project Vote Smart

1951 births
Living people
Republican Party members of the Pennsylvania House of Representatives
Pennsylvania city council members
People from Chester, Pennsylvania